Tim Goodwin may refer to:
 Tim Goodwin (South Dakota politician), member of the South Dakota House of Representatives
 Tim Goodwin (Iowa politician), member of the Iowa Senate

See also
 Timothy Goodwin, archbishop of Cashel